Dominic Gilbert (born 28 September 1996) is an Australian-Croatian professional basketball player for Eastern of the ASEAN Basketball League.

Early life and professional career
Gilbert was born in Hong Kong, where his parents lived for several years. He was raised in Sydney, Australia. He studied at the University of British Columbia in Vancouver, Canada when he decided to pursue a career in professional basketball in Croatia, country of his mother's origin.

After playing in Kvarner 2010 and Šanac Karlovac, in 2017 he signed for Cibona. In May 2019, he scored the decisive points in the last moments of the 4th game of the final series of the 2018–19 Croatian League, taking the title for Cibona.

In August 2019, he signed for Zadar, continuing to play in the Croatian League and ABA League.

In December, 2020, unsatisfied with his status in Zadar, Gilbert moved to Heroes Den Bosch of the Dutch Basketball League.

Gilbert played for Heroes Den Bosch until June 2021, when he moved to the French ADA Blois. After playing only four games in the LNB Pro B, in August, 2021, Gilbert moved back to Croatia, signing with Alkar.

On February 23, 2022, he has signed with Real Valladolid of the Spanish LEB Oro.

References

External links
Dominic Gilbert Profile at abaliga.com
Dominic Gilbert Profile at Eurobasket.com
Dominic Gilbert Profile at realgm.com

1996 births
Living people
ADA Blois Basket 41 players
Australian men's basketball players
Australian people of Croatian descent
Basketball players from Sydney
Forwards (basketball)
Heroes Den Bosch players
KK Cibona players
KK Kvarner 2010 players
ASEAN Basketball League players
Eastern Sports Club basketball players
KK Zadar players
KK Alkar players